James Chesnut Jr. (January 18, 1815 – February 1, 1885) was an American lawyer and politician, and a Confederate functionary.

Chesnut, a lawyer prominent in South Carolina state politics, served as a Democratic senator in 1858–60, where he proved moderate on the slavery question. But on Lincoln's election in 1860, Chesnut resigned from the U.S. Senate and took part in the South Carolina secession convention, later helping to draft the Confederate States Constitution. He was Deputy from South Carolina to the Provisional Congress of the Confederate States from 1861 to 1862. He also served as a senior officer of the Confederate States Army in the Eastern Theater of the American Civil War.

As aide to General P.G.T. Beauregard, he ordered the firing on Fort Sumter and served at First Manassas. Later he was aide to Jefferson Davis and promoted to Brigadier-General. Chesnut returned to law practice after the war.

His wife was Mary Boykin Chesnut, whose published diaries reflect the Chesnuts' busy social life and prominent friends such as John Bell Hood, Louis T. Wigfall, Wade Hampton III, and Jefferson Davis.

Early life and education
James Chesnut Jr., was born the youngest of fourteen children and the only (surviving) son of James Chesnut Sr. (1775–1866) and his wife, Mary Cox (1777–1864) on Mulberry Plantation near Camden, South Carolina.  Chesnut Sr. was one of the wealthiest planters in the South, who owned 448 slaves and many large plantations totaling nearly five square miles before the outbreak of the Civil War. Chesnut Jr. graduated from the law department of the College of New Jersey (now Princeton University) in 1835, and initially rose to prominence in South Carolina state politics.

Political career
Admitted to the bar in 1837, Chesnut Jr. commenced practice that year in Camden.  He was later elected as a member of the South Carolina House of Representatives (1840–52) and the South Carolina Senate (1852–58, serving as its president 1856–58). He was a delegate to the southern convention at Nashville, Tennessee, in 1850.

In 1858 Chesnut was elected by the South Carolina Legislature to the U.S. Senate as a Democrat to replace Josiah J. Evans. He served there for two years alongside Senator James Henry Hammond of South Carolina. Although a defender of slavery and states' rights, Chesnut opposed the re-opening of the African slave trade and was not as staunch a secessionist as most of the South Carolinian politicians. Moderate in his political views, he believed in extending protections for slavery's westward expansion while remaining within the Union.

But the political atmosphere tightened towards the Presidential Election of 1860, since the Republican Party and its presidential candidate, Abraham Lincoln, opposed slavery. After the results of the election were known, Chesnut decided that he could no longer stay in his office in the Senate. Shortly after Lincoln's election, he was the first Southern senator to withdraw from the Senate, on November 10, 1860. (He was expelled in absentia from the Senate the next year.)

Chesnut participated in the South Carolina secession convention in December 1860 and was subsequently elected to the Provisional Congress of the Confederate States. He was a member of the committee which drafted the Confederate States Constitution. Believing that the United States would not resist southern secession, Chesnut famously boasted that he would drink all of the blood which would be spilled in the subsequent Civil War.

American Civil War

In the spring of 1861, he served as an aide-de-camp to General P.G.T. Beauregard and was sent by the general to demand the surrender of Fort Sumter in Charleston. After the commander of the fort, Major Robert Anderson of the U.S. Army declined to surrender, Chesnut gave orders to the nearby Fort Johnson to open fire on Fort Sumter. In consequence the first shots of the Civil War were fired, on April 12, 1861. In the summer of 1861 Chesnut also took part in the First Battle of Manassas as an aide-de-camp to Beauregard.

In 1862 Chesnut served as a member of the South Carolina's Executive Council and the Chief of the Department of the Military of South Carolina. Later in the war he served the Confederate Army as a colonel and an aide to Confederate President Jefferson Davis. In 1864 he was promoted to brigadier general and given command of South Carolina reserve forces until the end of the war. He was third in command of the confederate forces at the Battle of Tulifinny. He was in overall command before the arrival of Maj. Gen. Samuel Jones and later Brig. Gen. Lucius Gartrell. After the war, he returned to the practice of law in Camden and formed the Conservative Party.

Personal life
Although James Chesnut Jr. was the only son, his father had given him little of his extensive property.  Because his father lived to the age of 90 and gave his son but a small allowance, the son James had to live mainly on his law practice. The Chesnut fortune declined in the course of the war and thus, after his father died in 1866, Chesnut inherited little more than the extensive debts that encumbered the Mulberry and Sandy Hill plantations.

Chesnut married seventeen-year-old Mary Boykin Miller (1823–86), on April 23, 1840. She later became well known for her book on life during the Civil War, published as a diary but revised extensively from 1881 to 1886. The daughter of U.S. Senator Stephen Decatur Miller (1788–1838) and Mary Boykin (1804–85), she was well-educated and intelligent and took part in her husband's career. The Chesnuts' marriage was at times stormy due to difference in temperament (she was hot-tempered and passionate and came occasionally to regard her husband as cool and reserved). Their companionship was mostly warm and affectionate but they had no children.  The couple resided at Chesnut Cottage in Columbia during the Civil War period.

As Mary Chesnut described in depth in her diary, the Chesnuts had a wide circle of friends and acquaintances in the society of the South and the Confederacy. Among their friends were, for example, Confederate general John Bell Hood, ex-Governor John L. Manning, Confederate general and politician John S. Preston and his wife Caroline, Confederate general and politician Wade Hampton III, Confederate politician Clement C. Clay and his wife Virginia, and Confederate general and politician Louis T. Wigfall and his wife Charlotte. The Chesnuts were intimate family friends of President Jefferson Davis and his wife Varina Howell. James Chesnut was also a first cousin of fellow Confederate general Zachariah C. Deas.

Death
James Chesnut was "regarded as an amiable, modest gentleman of decent parts [gifts]", who performed his duties with ability and dignity both in political and military life. He died at home in Camden in 1885; interment was in Chesnut Family Cemetery, Kershaw County, South Carolina.

See also
 List of American Civil War generals (Confederate)
 List of United States senators expelled or censured
 Johnson Chesnut Whittaker (1858–1931), born on the Chestnut plantation, one of the first black men to win an appointment to the United States Military Academy at West Point

Notes

References

 Cauthen, Charles E.: South Carolina Goes to War: 1860–1865. Chapel Hill: The University of North Carolina Press 1950.
 Chesnut, Mary Boykin: Mary Chesnut's Civil War. New Haven: Yale University Press 1981), ed. C. Vann Woodward.
 Eicher, John H. & Eicher, David J.: Civil War High Commands. Stanford: Stanford University Press, 2001. .
 Hammond, James Henry: Secret And Sacred: The Diaries of James Henry Hammond, a Southern Slaveholder. Edited by Carol Bleser. New York: Oxford University Press 1988. 
 Muhlenfeld, Elisabeth: Mary Boykin Chesnut: A Biography. Baton Rouge: Louisiana State University Press, 1992.
 Scarborough, William Kaufman: The Masters of the Big House: Elite Slaveholders of the Mid-Nineteenth-Century South. Baton Rouge: Louisiana State University Press, 2003.
 Sifakis, Stewart: Who Was Who in the Civil War. New York: Facts On File, 1988. .
 Sinha, Manisha, The Counterrevolution of Slavery: Politics and Ideology in Antebellum South Carolina. Chapel Hill: The University of North Carolina Press, 2000.
 Warner, Ezra J.: Generals in Gray: Lives of the Confederate Commanders. Baton Rouge: Louisiana State University Press, 1959. .
 Williams, T. Harry: Beauregard: Napoleon in Gray. Baton Rouge: Louisiana State University Press 1955.

Further reading

External links
 
 James Chesnut Jr. at The Political Graveyard
 
James Chesnut Letter Book at Stuart A. Rose Manuscript, Archives, and Rare Book Library

1815 births
1885 deaths
19th-century American politicians
Burials in South Carolina
Confederate States Army brigadier generals
Conservative Party (South Carolina) politicians
Democratic Party United States senators from South Carolina
Deputies and delegates to the Provisional Congress of the Confederate States
Expelled United States senators
Democratic Party members of the South Carolina House of Representatives
People of South Carolina in the American Civil War
Signers of the Confederate States Constitution
Signers of the Provisional Constitution of the Confederate States